Histiogamphelus is a genus of fish known as the crested pipefishes. They belong to the family Syngnathidae and are endemic to  the southern coast of Australia and Tasmania. They have a characteristic "crest" on the snout, which can help distinguish them from other related genera within the sub-family Syngnathinae. Their brown-tan coloration may mimic the Posidonia sea grass in which they are often found. Like all syngnathids, the male broods the eggs in a brood pouch (in this genus located under the tail).

Species
There are currently two recognized species in this genus:
 Histiogamphelus briggsii McCulloch, 1914 (Briggs' pipefish)
 Histiogamphelus cristatus W. J. Macleay, 1881 (Macleay's crested pipefish)

References

Syngnathidae
Ray-finned fish genera